New Market is a Thana of Dhaka District in the Division of Dhaka, Bangladesh. New Market and Chandni Chowk is situated in this thana area.

See also
 New Market, Dhaka

References

Thanas of Dhaka